Relentless is the second studio album by American metalcore band For the Fallen Dreams. It is the first album to feature vocalist Dylan Richter. It was released on July 21, 2009, through Rise Records and was produced by the band themselves and Joey Sturgis. The album charted at number 29 on the Billboard Top Heatseekers chart.

Background
On January 7, 2009, a demo of "Smoke Signals" was posted on the group's Myspace. In addition, it was mentioned that the group was working on their next album, aiming for its release in summer.

Release
The album was released on July 21, 2009. This is the last album by For the Fallen Dreams to feature founding member and principal songwriter Andrew Tkaczyk before his departure from the band in February 2011. In July and August, the band performed on the Thrash and Burn tour.

Track listing

Personnel

For the Fallen Dreams
Dylan Richter – lead vocals
Jim Hocking – lead guitar, backing vocals
Chris Cain – rhythm guitar
Joe Ellis – bass guitar, backing vocals
Andrew Tkaczyk – drums, percussion

Additional musicians
Jeremy McKinnon of A Day to Remember – guest vocals on track 4, "Nightmares"

Additional personnel
Joey Sturgis – production, engineering, mixing, mastering
For the Fallen Dreams – production
Sons of Nero and Dylan Richter – art, layout
Phill Mamula – photography
Alexandra McGregor – model

References

2009 albums
For the Fallen Dreams albums
Rise Records albums
Albums with cover art by Sons of Nero
Albums produced by Joey Sturgis